Dorcadion komarowi is a species of beetle in the family Cerambycidae. It was described by Jakovlev in 1887.

Subspecies
 Dorcadion komarowi komarowi Jakovlev, 1887
 Dorcadion komarowi kryzhanovskii Plavilstshikov, 1958

References

komarowi
Beetles described in 1887